The United Kingdom's mobile phone alert system is an emergency population warning system that uses cell broadcast. Early testing began in 2014, with the first test alert sent in March 2020. The system is intended for use for major crises such as flooding or terror attacks. The Emergency Alert System was launched on 19 March 2023.

History 
During the Cold War, the UK developed an emergency alert system called the Wartime Broadcasting Service, aimed to keep UK residents informed after a catastrophic wartime attack, such as a nuclear warhead detonation or severe bombing.

The state of this system is currently unknown to the public, and most information about it is held exclusively by BBC high-ranking executives and government officials.

Early cell broadcast trials 
In 2013, the Government of the United Kingdom trialled a system similar to other countries in which cell broadcasts would be simultaneously broadcast to multiple mobile devices. The final project report in 2014 found that "Responders remain very keen to see the implementation of a national mobile alert system" and that "the majority of people (85%) felt that a mobile alert system was a good idea." The report said it was the hope to carry out more trials, however past that point no further trials were conducted. An earlier 2012 report ("Extended Floodline Warnings Direct Trial") by the Cabinet Office using mobile phone calls found that only 12% of recipients acknowledged the alert. During the COVID-19 pandemic in the United Kingdom, the government was accused of ignoring its own advice to set up UK emergency alert system and how after seven years of the Cabinet Office's own report showing such systems were successful, there was "no sign of a system being developed."

In 2019 and early 2020, the Environment Agency collaborated with EE, Fujitsu and The University of Hull to trial Cell Broadcasting technologies for the purpose of flood warning.

Cell broadcast trial and implementation 

In 2020, the UK began developing an emergency alert system using Cell Broadcast in collaboration with UK mobile networks.

In March 2021, a test across all networks on the test channels took place in Reading with the British government's Flood Information Service updating a page on its website, stating that the new cell broadcast system is being tested, and some devices may receive test alerts. This page was updated again in April for further operator tests.

A test broadcast was made for customers on O2 on 11 May 2021 at around 8 am to users who had enabled test alerts in their phone's Wireless Alerts settings. A similar trial was run on 20 May for EE customers. Two alerts were sent, received at around 13:21 and 13:48 respectively.

The first test on the public channels for the new Emergency Alerts System was on 25 May in East Suffolk, the second test of the system was on 29 June in Reading, before being rolled out with an introduction Emergency Alert nationwide in October 2022. The system is guaranteed to work on iOS 14.5 and later, and on Android 11 and later, though if Wireless Alerts settings are available on older Android devices, the alerts are very likely to work on those, too. but due to recent heat alerts in the UK, the system is now expected to go live in October with a Government publicity campaign in September.
Since the majority of Android devices are already compatible with Cell Broadcast alerts such as the USA's WEA system, most older Android devices should also be compatible.

The alerts will only be available on devices that connect to the UK's 4G and 5G networks, and not 2G or 3G, despite Cell Broadcast being part of the GSM specification since before 2G adoption was widespread in the UK. The loud sound that is played on receiving an alert is exactly the same sound that is used on smartphones in the US. If the phone is set to read out alerts, the attention signal only sounds three times compared to the 10 second blast for normal phones.  Users can opt out of the alerts.

As of 3 January 2023 the UK Emergency Alert System is still in testing phase and is expected to be rolled out in 2023.

The Emergency Alert System was nationally launched on Sunday 19 March 2023, almost 2 years after the first public test.

Coronavirus (COVID-19) pandemic 
On 24 March 2020, the government collaborated with all UK mobile networks to send a text message to inform people of the new lockdown rules.

On 26 December 2021, the government sent another nationwide text message to inform the population about the availability of COVID-19 booster vaccinations, available for free through the NHS.

Emergency Alerts service 
Following a series of tests in East Suffolk and Reading, on Sunday 19 March 2023, the UK's Emergency Alerts service was launched nationally. It is intended to allow government and the emergency services to send a text alert to mobile phones in a situation where there is perceived to be an immediate risk to life. Mobile users will receive an alert accompanied by a siren-like noise, which they must acknowledge in order to use the phone's other features. In an emergency the alert will inform people where the emergency is, and tell them what they need to do in response. On the day of its launch, the UK Government confirmed plans to conduct a national test of the system on the evening of 23 April 2023. About 90% of phones in the UK are expected to receive the test alert.

See also 
 Preparing for Emergencies
 Four-minute warning
 Wartime Broadcasting Service
 Wireless Emergency Alerts, a very similar mobile emergency warning system utilised in the United States
 HANDEL

References

External links 
 Official website
 Public emergency alerts: mobile alerting trials

United Kingdom
Emergency management in the United Kingdom
United Kingdom